Parlevliet is a surname. It may refer to:
Erik Parlevliet (1964–2007), Dutch field hockey player
Jennifer Parlevliet (born 1960), Australian show-jumping equestrian